Henry Nelson Pope (April 23, 1859 - June 13, 1956) was president of the Texas Farmers Union and president of the Association of State Presidents of the Farmers' Education and Cooperative Union of America, and president of the American Federation of Organized Producers and Consumers.

Biography
He was born on April 23, 1859, in Mountainburg, Arkansas to John H. Pope and Arena Edwards. He married Sarah Jane Cope around 1878. In 1916 he testified before the United States Congress opposing the eight-hour workday for interstate railroads that was imposed by the Adamson Act.

His wife died in 1950. He died on June 13, 1956, in Fort Worth, Texas.

References

External links

1859 births
1956 deaths